The 2019–20 DEL2 season was the seventh season since the founding of the DEL2, the second tier of German ice hockey, set below the Deutsche Eishockey Liga. The season began on 13 September 2019 and prematurely ended on 10 March 2020 due to the coronavirus pandemic (COVID-19). Löwen Frankfurt was named winner of the regular season, but no season champion was declared with the championship play-offs called off. In addition, the relegation play-offs were also cancelled so the league decided there would be no relegation for the season.

Modus

Fourteen teams competed in the 2019–20 DEL2 regular season. EV Landshut was promoted from Germany's third division, Oberliga. Each team played each other twice in the regular season, home and away, for a total of 52 matches each. The top six teams directly qualified for the championship playoffs, played in a best of seven format. Teams placed seven to ten advanced to the championship playoff qualifiers, which followed a best of three format. The bottom four teams enter the relegation playoffs. The two losing teams from round 1 face off in the relegation final with the losing team being relegated to Oberliga.

The DEL2 champion does not automatically get promoted to DEL. In September 2015, the DEL and DEL2 agreed to reintroduce promotion and relegation between the two leagues from the 2017–18 season onwards. The DEL2 champion would then have the opportunity to be promoted, provided it fulfilled the licensing requirements of the DEL, while the last-placed DEL club would be relegated. In 2018, the two leagues signed a new agreement to reintroduce an automatic promotion and relegation system to start in 2020–21.

Regular season

Results

The cross table represents the results of all matches of the regular season for 2019/20. The home team is listed in the middle column, the visiting team in the top row.

Legend: O Overtime; S Shootout

Notes:

Standings

Top scorers
These are the top-ten scorers in DEL2 for the 2019–20 season. (Table is created at the conclusion of the DEL2 regular season)

Source:

Top goaltenders
These are the top-ten goaltenders in DEL2 for the 2019–20 season. (Table is created at the conclusion of the DEL2 regular season)

Note: To qualify for this list, goaltenders need to have played a minimum of 20 matches 
Source:

Playoffs

Due to the early cancellation of the season, the championship and relegation play-offs were called off without being played. DEL2 decided no team would be relegated and no team would be named champion.

Championship
The championship playoffs reference:

Note: All numbers represent series results, not a match score

References

External links

 Official website
 Official Facebook
 Elite Prospects home

2019-20 DEL2
2019–20 in German ice hockey
Germany
Ice hockey events curtailed due to the COVID-19 pandemic